Elizabeth Street is one of the main streets in the central business district of Melbourne, Victoria, Australia, part of the Hoddle Grid laid out in 1837. It is presumed to have been named in honour of governor Richard Bourke's wife.

The street is known as a retail shopping precinct. It is connected with key shopping and tourist destinations such as Bourke Street Mall, Melbourne's GPO, Melbourne Central Shopping Centre, Emporium Melbourne and Queen Victoria Market.

Geography 

The street runs roughly north-south in-between Queen Street and Swanston Street. At the southern end the street terminates at Flinders Street station, whilst the northern end terminates at Grattan Street, north of the Haymarket Roundabout.

Haymarket connects Elizabeth Street to Peel Street towards the south-west, Flemington Road to the north-west, Royal Parade to the north and Grattan Street to the East. This complex, high-traffic roundabout is further complicated by trams travelling through it on varying routes. Traffic lights were installed on the roundabout in 2011 to limit the dangerous complexity of the intersection, it having previously functioned as a normal roundabout.

Floods 
Elizabeth Street is the lowest point in the Melbourne central business district, with land rising both to the east and west, and more gradually to the north. The street was built on top of a historic natural creek and has suffered numerous floods in Melbourne's history.

Flash flooding south towards the Yarra River occurred in 1882, 1972 and more recently during the 2010 Victorian storms. The Elizabeth Street drain runs from Carlton in the north to the Yarra River in the south, carrying storm water from the inner northern suburbs and city centre. This drain is a significant source of pollutants entering the lower Yarra.

Notable buildings 
Elizabeth Street is home to many historically important buildings, modern structures and works of art. These various works are listed on both the Victorian Heritage Register and National Trust of Australia.

Victorian Heritage Register 
 Flinders Street Station
 Melbourne City Building
 General Post Office
 Underground Toilets
 Mitchell House
 Block Arcade
 Royal Arcade
 Queen Victoria Market
 Hosies Hotel Mural
 Former Melford Motors
 St Francis Church

National Trust 

 289 Elizabeth Street
 Angus & Robertson Building
 London Hotel
 Royal Saxon Hotel
 Argus Building
 Paton Building
 Brooks' Chambers
 Michaels Building
 Ampol House (demolished by the University of Melbourne and replaced with the Peter Doherty Institute)
 Former Colonial Bank
 Former Kodak Factory Complex
 Former Hosies Hotel & Richard Beck Mural
 Womens Christian Temperance Union Drinking Fountain
 Heape Court Warehouses

Motorcycle and Camera Precincts 

Elizabeth Street has been home to a number of photography retailers and a considerable number of motorcycle dealers. The street has been the home of motorbike retailing in inner Melbourne since 1903, the longest-existing such area in the world.

Transport 

As well as Flinders Street station at the southern end, the western exit of Melbourne Central railway station is located at the intersection of Latrobe and Elizabeth Streets. A number of tram services run along the street, including route 19 trams to Coburg North, route 59 trams to Airport West and route 57 trams to West Maribyrnong.

See also

References

External links

 Elizabeth Street in flood, 1882 State Library Victoria, accessed 23 March 2015.
 Elizabeth Street in flood, 1862 State Library Victoria, accessed 23 March 2015.
 Elizabeth Street flood, 1972

 
Streets in Melbourne City Centre